"We're Here for a Good Time (Not a Long Time)" is a song by Canadian rock band Trooper. It was released in June 1977 as the lead single from their third studio album Knock 'Em Dead Kid. Despite only reaching number 43 in Canada, the song has continued to be popular, receiving a SOCAN Classic Award in 1999 in recognition of 100,000 radio plays.

Charts

References

1977 songs
1977 singles